Earl Melvin Harrison (March 24, 1900 – August 15, 1953) was an American Negro league pitcher from 1927 to 1930.

A native of St. Louis, Missouri, Harrison made his Negro leagues debut with the St. Louis Stars in 1927. He went on to play for the Homestead Grays and Kansas City Monarchs through 1930. Harrison was shot and killed by Dock Booker in an argument over their respective baseball abilities.

References

External links
 and Seamheads

1900 births
1953 deaths
Homestead Grays players
Kansas City Monarchs players
St. Louis Stars (baseball) players